Yaeger Lake is a lake in Wadena County, in the U.S. state of Minnesota.

Yaeger Lake was named for an early settler.

See also
List of lakes in Minnesota

References

Lakes of Minnesota
Lakes of Wadena County, Minnesota